Michael John Norman (born 17 August 1952 in Launceston, Tasmania) is a former Australian cricket player, who played for Tasmania.

Norman was a right-handed batsman who represented Tasmania from 1975 until 1979. He played in Tasmania's inaugural Sheffield Shield match in October 1977. He made his highest first-class score on his first-class debut against the West Indians in 1975-76 when he top-scored in Tasmania's first innings with 65.

See also
 List of Tasmanian representative cricketers

References

External links
 

1952 births
Living people
Australian cricketers
Tasmania cricketers
Cricketers from Launceston, Tasmania